Dębowiec  (formerly German Eichberg) is a village in the administrative district of Gmina Bledzew, within Międzyrzecz County, Lubusz Voivodeship, in western Poland.

The village has a population of 43.

References

Villages in Międzyrzecz County